Maria Petrova may refer to:
Maria Petrova (rhythmic gymnast) (born 1975), rhythmic gymnast from Bulgaria
 Maria Petrova (figure skater) (born 1977), pairs figure skater from Russia
 Maria Petrova (spree killer) (born 1978), Russian spree killer